Edith DesMarais is a New Hampshire politician.

Education
DesMarais graduated from Portland High School in Maine. DesMarais attended Gorham State Teacher's College, now known as the University of Southern Maine.

Career
In 2017, DesMarais was elected to the New Hampshire House of Representatives where she represents the Carroll 6 district. She assumed office on June 7, 2017. She is a Democrat.

Personal life
DesMarais resides in Wolfeboro, New Hampshire. DesMarais is married and has four children.

References

Living people
Portland High School (Maine) alumni
People from Wolfeboro, New Hampshire
Women state legislators in New Hampshire
Democratic Party members of the New Hampshire House of Representatives
21st-century American politicians
21st-century American women politicians
Year of birth missing (living people)
University of Southern Maine alumni